Parachma ochracealis is a species of pyralid moth in the family Pyralidae.

The MONA or Hodges number for Parachma ochracealis is 5538.

References

Further reading

External links

 

Chrysauginae
Moths described in 1866